Scripted teaching or scripted instruction refers to commercial reading programs that have highly structured lessons, often with specific time allotments for teaching specific skills, and often word-for-word scripts of what the teacher is to say. Scripted instruction has often been advocated for schools where teachers have had inadequate teacher training and is also seen as way to standardize the quality of instruction. Critics say that such programs stifle teachers' creativity, undermine teachers' expertise, and fail to provide for the diverse needs of many classrooms. Advocates see it as the easiest way to provide teachers with the essential elements of effective reading instruction. Scripted instruction has also been applied to preparation of lessons in many other subject matter areas.

One widely used program using scripts is the Success for All reading instruction program.

Scripted instruction has been an integral part of the direct instruction (DI) approach to education which has been presented as a structured alternative to the constructionist approaches to teaching such as discovery learning.

There is extensive additional information on scripted teaching available on the International Reading Association website.

Scripted Teaching

Meaning of Scripted Teaching 

Scripted teaching can be traced back as far as 1888 where Samuel and Adeline Monroe published text for teachers that provided them with scripts for teaching reading readiness, phonics, and oral reading (Commeyras 2007). In this method of teaching, the teacher is expected to read the lesson scripts verbatim. It is a form of direct instruction meant to guide teachers in order to sustain consistency in teaching strategies by teachers. It also hopes to eliminate the risk of poor instruction by inexperienced teachers (Lee). Its purpose of strict adherence to the script is targeted more towards schools with low standardized test scores so that the concepts being taught can be delivered in a consistent manner, in hopes that the students will understand the lessons more clearly. This strategy is becoming more prevalent in US school districts, as well as schools throughout the world (Reeves 2010).

The Goal of Scripted Teaching 

Many school districts are moving to scripted teaching programs with a goal of improving students’ standardized test scores. With more pressure being put on teachers to have their students achieve higher standardized test scores, teachers are looking to use scripted teaching programs as an aid to teach these concepts to their students, hoping that it will be a more effective way of teaching (Guccione 2011). Scripts designed for teaching curriculum are not meant to eliminate the amount of teacher preparation, but are to be used as a scaffold for teachers to adhere to the topics and skills required of students. When used properly, scripted teaching programs are used as a tool that teachers can add and subtract parts of the structure to create a learning environment that facilitates appropriate instruction individualized to the needs of their learners (Guccione 2011). Hundreds of schools could be using the same scripted curriculum; however, if used appropriately, their lessons will be carried out differently as a reflection of the diverse learners in their respective classrooms. The goal is that all of the students will learn the same concepts and be able to use the knowledge that comes from the scripted lessons.

Behaviorist Learning Theory 

Scripted teaching is influenced by behaviorist learning theory (Reeves 2010). It uses repetition as a way to reinforce the concepts that students are learning. Some scripted learning programs (for example, Language for Learning) go through an error correction process when a student answers a question incorrectly. Using a behavioral approach to teaching and learning, micro skills such as spelling are practiced meticulously and are perfected before moving onto macro skills such as writing or reading longer passages (Reeves 2010).

Critiques 

A common critique about scripted teaching presumes that any person can come into a classroom and teach a lesson if they follow the script (Commeyras 2007). However, proponents of scripted teaching maintain that just like an actor brings life to his script, a teacher can and must use his own personality to breathe life into the teaching script (Commeyras 2007). Scripted teaching programs are meant to be used as a support for teachers to help them develop their own teaching style and confidence in their teaching ability (Reeves 2010). Teachers who are first introduced to scripted teaching tend to feel that they are being held back from utilizing their own knowledge when they are required to instruct using an external script (Reeves 2010). This also leads to teachers feeling that they cannot respond when a student answers with an unusual answer (Parks & Bridges-Rhoads 2012); however, teachers who are experienced in scripted teaching find a way to build on the unusual answers and find their way back to the script. Teachers who have learned that reading written language involves accuracy, fluency, self-monitoring, and comprehension are more successful at scripted teaching (Commeyras 2007). A final critique is that scripted teaching de-professionalizes teachers, stifling their creative potential (Reeves 2010).

References 

Commeyras, M. (2007, January). Scripted reading instruction? What's a teacher educator to do?. Phi Delta Kappan, Vol. 88, No. 05, January
2007, pp. 404–407. Retrieved from http://www.pdkmembers.org/members_online/publications/Archive/pdf/k0701com.pdf

Eisenbach, B. (2012). Teacher Belief and Practice in a Scripted Curriculum. The Clearing House : A Journal of Educational Strategies, Issues and Ideas, 85:4, pp. 153–156. 

Guccione, L. (2011, January). The tale of two schools: Making room for relation within scripted programs. Schools: Studies In Education, 8(2), 252-264

Lee, M. (n.d.). Is your child being taught from a script?. Retrieved from http://www.education.com/magazine/article/Scripted_Teaching/

Parks, A., & Bridges-Rhoads, S. (2012). Overly Scripted: Exploring the Impact of a Scripted Literacy Curriculum on a Preschool Teacher's Instructional Practices in Mathematics. Journal of Research in Childhood Education, 26(3), 308-324

Reeves, J. (2010, July). Teacher learning by script. Language Teaching Research, 14(3), 241-258

External links
International Reading Association
"Do Scripted Lessons Work or Not" by Sarah Colt, The article describes both positive and negative reactions to using the scripts in the Success for All reading program

Standards-based education
Phonics curricula
United States Department of Education